Willoughby is a suburb located on the lower North Shore of Sydney, in the state of New South Wales, Australia 8 kilometres north of the Sydney central business district, in the local government area of the City of Willoughby.

The City of Willoughby takes its name from the suburb but its administrative centre is located in the adjacent suburb of Chatswood, which is the local area's major commercial centre.

History

Aboriginal culture

European settlement
There is some conjecture as to how Willoughby was named. Some historians believe it was named after a parish, while others believe that Surveyor-General Sir Thomas Mitchell decided to commemorate Sir James Willoughby Gordon whom he had served during the Peninsular War and was the quartermaster-general in England when the First Fleet sailed to Botany Bay.

Captain Arthur Phillip's search for "good land, well watered" led to the discovery and colonisation of the rough shores of Roseville Chase, where Samuel Bates built a farm at Echo Point.

Later developments included the building of the first post office in 1871 and the construction of Pommy Lodge in the same year. The latter—a small sandstone building in Penshurst Street—was originally the Congregational Church, which later changed premises. Laurel Bank Cottage, a single-storey home, was constructed in Penshurst Street in 1884. The cottage is now owned and run by the local Masonic Lodge as a function and conference facility.

Circa 1920, Telford Lane—between Fourth Avenue and Eastern Valley Way—was created and paved; the method used was the one pioneered by Thomas Telford in England in the nineteenth century. This lane is one of the few surviving examples of the Telford method in Sydney.

In 1934, the Willoughby incinerator was built in Small Street, after a design by Walter Burley Griffin. It has been described as "a particularly successful example of an industrial building integrating function with site." Like Telford Lane, the incinerator is listed on the (now defunct) Register of the National Estate.

The suburb was home to the headquarters of the Nine Network, under the callsign of TCN-9 for 64 years until it moved to North Sydney in November 2020. Next to this site was the Channel 9 TV Tower which at 233 metres high was the tallest in Australia; its demolition commenced in April 2021, to be replaced by 460 new homes.

Heritage listings 
Willoughby has a number of heritage-listed sites, including:
 85-87 Penshurst Street: Laurelbank
 2 Small Street: Walter Burley Griffin Incinerator, Willoughby

Commercial area

Willoughby has a number of small shops, restaurants and hotels.  There are several small groupings of shops, the majority of which are on Mowbray Road, Willoughby Road, Penshurst Street and High Street.

Parks and recreation
Bicentennial Reserve which includes Hallstrom Park, features a soccer field, T Ball & softball fields and a children's playground. Willoughby Leisure Centre features a 25m lap pool, spas, children's pool, swim school, gym, basketball courts, netball courts and baseball field. Flat Rock Gully, built on an old rubbish tip, is bushland with two walking tracks to Long Bay, following the creek line.
 Carlson Park
 Julian St Park
 Willoughby Squash courts
 Hallstrom Park
 Willoughby Park

Transport
Artarmon is the nearest station for Willoughby's residents, on the western border of the suburb. Also, a number of bus routes cover the area. It is close to St Leonards and Chatswood stations. The Gore Hill Freeway, a major arterial route into the Sydney CBD, runs along the southern border of Willoughby, with exit from the freeway from Reserve Road and entry from Reserve Road and Willoughby Road. 
Bus Routes serving Willoughby include:
115 Chatswood – Pitt Street via Crows Nest, North Sydney
120 Chatswood – Queen Victoria Building via Warringah Freeway
205 Willoughby East – City Gresham Street via Warringah Freeway
267 Chatswood – Crows Nest via Northbridge

Busways' Willoughby Bus Depot is located in Willoughby East.

Schools
 Willoughby Public School (K – Year 6)
 Willoughby Girls High School (Year 7 – Year 12, girls only)
 St Thomas' Catholic Primary School (K – Year 6, Catholic School)

Other
 Willoughby Fire Station, Laurel Street
 1st Willoughby Scouts, Laurel Street
 Bridgeview Hotel, Willoughby Road
 The Willoughby Hotel, Penshurst Street

Churches
  Armenian Evangelical Church
  St Stephen's Anglican Church
  St Thomas's Catholic Church
  Willoughby Uniting Church
  Willoughby Presbyterian Church

Population

In the 2016 Census, there were 6,540 people in Willoughby. 62.5% of people were born in Australia. The next most common countries of birth were England 4.7%, China 3.4%, New Zealand 2.2% and Hong Kong 2.0%. 68.9% of people only spoke English at home. Other languages spoken at home included Mandarin 4.3%, Cantonese 4.1%, Armenian 2.2%, Japanese 2.1% and Italian 1.7%. The most common responses for religion were No Religion 32.4%, Catholic 28.4% and Anglican 13.7%.

Willoughby is known for a large Armenian community, who arrived in the area in the 1960s-1970s. More Armenian families made their home there once an Armenian Apostolic Church was built on Macquarie Street, Chatswood, close to the border with Willoughby. Willoughby contains several Armenian Churches and Community Centres (Cultural Clubs). It is home to the first Armenian Saturday School which still operates on Saturdays at Willoughby Girls High.

Notable residents

 John Davies, gold medal-winning Olympic swimmer for Australia in the 1952 Summer Olympics
 Matthew Reilly, best-selling author
 Evonne Goolagong, tennis legend
 Doc Neeson, lead singer of The Angels

Gallery

Heritage

References

External links

Willoughby, Willoughby City Council – community profile
North Willoughby/Willoughby East, Willoughby City Council – community profile
Willoughby City Council – Official Willoughby City Council website
Willoughby Girls High School – Official Willoughby Girls High School website
Willoughby Public School – Official Willoughby Public School website
1st Willoughby Scouts – 1st Willoughby Scouts Website
Willoughby District Historical Society

 
Suburbs of Sydney
City of Willoughby